This article is about the particular significance of the year 1942 to Wales and its people.

Incumbents
Archbishop of Wales – Charles Green, Bishop of Bangor
Archdruid of the National Eisteddfod of Wales – Crwys

Events
30 January – Scarweather lightvessel in Swansea Bay sinks.
28 March – St Nazaire Raid: Lt-Commander Stephen Halden Beattie steers HMS Campbeltown through an enemy attack, winning the Victoria Cross for his courage under fire.
13 April – The Cardiff East by-election, caused by the appointment of sitting National Conservative MP, Owen Temple-Morris, as a county court judge is uncontested, under an agreement between the Conservative, Labour and Liberal parties, who are participating in a wartime coalition. 
25 April – A Nazi German Luftwaffe Junkers 88 crashes into a hill near Builth Wells. Two crew members are killed, the other two taken prisoner.
25 May – A breach in the Glamorganshire Canal near Nantgarw is inspected but it is decided not to do any work on it; the canal closes permanently later in the year.
10 June – The Llandaff and Barry by-election, caused by the death  of the incumbent Conservative MP, Patrick Munro, is won by the Conservative candidate Cyril Lakin.
20 July – An RAF Lockheed Hudson crashes near Llanfair Dyffryn Clwyd, killing thirteen crew.
30 July – A Heinkel 111 crashes on Pwllheli beach, killing three crew; the survivor is captured.
11 August
A USAAF Flying Fortress crashes in the Berwyn range, killing six crew.
An RAF Wellington bomber crashes into St Brides Bay, killing six Polish crew.
18 August – The body of a German pilot is washed ashore at Newton on the South Wales coast. He is buried in the village of Nottage.
September – A USAAF Lockheed P-38 Lightning fighter aircraft crashes off the coast near Harlech.
22 October – The Welsh Courts Act is passed, allowing the Welsh language to be used in courts of law.
31 October – An RAF Wellington collides in mid-air with an RAF Bristol Beaufort near Bangor, killing seven crew.
16 November – An RAF Lancaster bomber crashes into Dolwen Hill, Llanerfyl, near Welshpool, killing seven crew.
December – The South Wales Coal Dust Research Committee produces its first report.
date unknown
A building at M. S. Factory, Valley in Flintshire is adapted for the testing of apparatus for separation of isotopes of uranium as part of the 'Tube Alloys' programme of research into development of nuclear weapons.
Caverns at the disused Croesor Quarry are requisitioned by the Ministry of Supply for explosives storage.
Houses for munitions workers at Whitchurch, Cardiff, are designed by Geoffrey Jellicoe.
During the development of RAF Valley on Anglesey, a hoard of La Tène metalwork is found in Llyn Cerrig Bach.

Arts and literature

Awards

National Eisteddfod of Wales (held in Cardigan)
National Eisteddfod of Wales: Chair - withheld
National Eisteddfod of Wales: Crown - Herman Jones
National Eisteddfod of Wales: Prose Medal - withheld

New books

English language
Roland Mathias - Days Enduring
Leslie Norris - Tongue of Beauty
John Cowper Powys - Owen Glendower (U.K. publication)
Hilda Vaughan - The Fair Woman (retelling of "The Lady of Llyn y Fan Fach", later republished as Iron and Gold)

Welsh language
D. Gwenallt Jones - Cnoi Cil
John Gwilym Jones - Y Dewis
Thomas Jones (T. J.) - Cerrig Milltir

Music
Sir Granville Bantock - Two Welsh Melodies and Celtic SymphonyFilm
Neath-born Ray Milland stars in Reap the Wild Wind.

Broadcasting
Welsh-language broadcasting
The radio series Caniadaeth y Cysegr'' is launched by the BBC, and soon proves unexpectedly popular with listeners in other parts of the UK. The hymn-based series celebrates its 75th anniversary in 2017.

Sport
Football
9 May – Wales defeat England 1-0
24 October – Wales defeat England 2-1

Births

2 January – Billy Hullin, Wales international rugby union player (died 2012)
31 January – Euros Lewis, cricketer (died 2014)
1 February – Terry Jones, writer, comedic actor and director (died 2020)
15 February – Leslie Griffiths, Methodist minister and politician
18 February – John Hughes, footballer 
9 March – John Cale, experimental rock musician
13 March
John Mantle, dual-code rugby player
Meic Stevens, singer-songwriter
21 March – Owain Arwel Hughes, orchestral conductor
28 March – Neil Kinnock, politician
1 April – Karl Francis, film-maker
5 April – Peter Greenaway, film-maker
1 May – Geoff Evans, rugby union player
20 May – Lynn Davies, athlete
21 May – David Hunt, Secretary of State for Wales 1990-93
25 May – Ron Davies, footballer
1 June – Bruce George, politician (died 2020)
8 June – Doug Mountjoy, snooker player
13 July – Hywel Gwynfryn, television presenter
17 July – Spencer Davis, musician
18 July – Roger Cecil, painter (d.2015)
20 July – Sylvia Heal, politician
27 July – Colin Lewis, cyclist
25 August – Michael J. Morgan, academic
5 September
Chris Corbett, rugby player
Betty Morgan, lawn bowler
16 September 
Barrie Hole, footballer
Jeff Young, rugby player
12 September – Delme Thomas, rugby player
7 October – Allan Lewis, rugby player
24 November – Craig Thomas, thriller writer (died 2011)
28 November – Jeffrey Lewis, composer
2 December – Brian Evans, footballer (died 2003)
4 December – Anthony G. Evans, mechanical engineer (died 2009)

Deaths
1 January – John Baldwin Hoystead Meredith, Welsh-Australian soldier and doctor, 77
7 January – Edward Arthur Lewis, historian
27 January – Tom Barlow, Welsh rugby player and cricketer, 77
10 February – Felix Powell, musician, 63
15 February – Frank Treharne James, lawyer, 80
22 March – Ebenezer Griffith-Jones, academic, 82
24 March – Will Osborne, Wales international rugby union player, 66
22 April
John John Evans, journalist
James Morgan Pryse, Welsh-descended American author, publisher, theosophist and founder of the Gnostic Society, 96
5 May – David Milwyn Duggan, Welsh-born Canadian politician, 62
14 May – Walter Watkins, footballer
10 July – Sydney Curnow Vosper, artist, 75
22 July – Gilbert Joyce, Bishop of Monmouth, 76
4 August – Arthur Vernon Davies
6 August – Francis Green, antiquary, 97
12 September – Valentine Baker, pilot, 54 (killed in flying accident)
24 September – David Walters (Eurof), minister and author
14 October – Jem Evans, Wales international rugby union player, 75
26 October – Richard Mathias, politician, 79
12 November – Hubert Prichard, Glamorgan cricketer, 77
7 December – Lionel Beaumont Thomas, businessman, British Army officer and politician, 49
22 December – Elias Henry Jones, British Army officer, educationist and author, 59

See also
1942 in Northern Ireland

References

 
Wales